The Garden Palace was a large, purpose-built exhibition building constructed to house the Sydney International Exhibition in 1879 in Sydney, Australia. It was designed by James Barnet and constructed by John Young, at a cost of £191,800 in only eight months. This was largely due to the importation from England of electric lighting, which enabled work to be carried out around the clock.

Description and history

A reworking of London's Crystal Palace, the plan for the Garden Palace was similar to that of a large cathedral, having a long hall with lower aisle on either side, like a nave, and a transept of similar form, each terminating in towers and meeting beneath a central dome. The successful contractor was John Young, a highly experienced building contractor who had worked on the Crystal Palace for The Great Exhibition of 1851 and locally on the General Post Office and Exhibition Building at Prince Alfred Park.

The dome was 100 feet (30.4 metres) in diameter and 210 feet (65.5 metres) in height.  The building was over 244 metres long and had a floor space of over 112,000 metres with 4.5 million feet of timber, 2.5 million bricks and 243 tons of galvanised corrugated iron. The building was similar in many respects to the later Royal Exhibition Building in Melbourne. Sydney's first hydraulic lift, was contained in the north tower, enabling visitors to climb the tower. The Garden Palace was sited at what is today the southwestern end of the Royal Botanic Garden (although at the time it was built it occupied land that was outside the Garden and in The Domain). It was constructed primarily from timber, which ensured its complete destruction when engulfed by fire in the early morning of 22 September 1882.
The Garden Palace at that time was used by a number of Government Departments and many significant records were destroyed in the fire, notably records of squatting occupation in New South Wales. Between 500 and 1000 pieces of Sydney Aboriginal artefacts were also lost in this fire.

The only extant remains of the Garden Palace are its carved Sydney sandstone gateposts and wrought iron gates, located on the Macquarie Street entrance to the Royal Botanical Garden.
A 1940s-era sunken garden and fountain featuring a statue of Cupid marks the former location of the Palace's dome. Few artefacts from the International Exhibition survived the fire, one of which is a carved graphite statue of an elephant, from Ceylon, now in the collection of the Powerhouse Museum. An 1878 Bechstein concert grand piano, that had won the musical instrument first prize at the Exhibition, but had luckily been removed from the Garden Palace prior to the fire, is also held by the Powerhouse.  A number of items are held by the State Library of NSW relating to The Garden Palace include a piece of molten glass from the Garden Palace fire, a handkerchief and a book, The Sydney Garden Palace : a patriotic and historical poem by Frederick Cumming.

See also

 List of destroyed heritage
 The Crystal Palace
 New York Crystal Palace
 Royal Exhibition Building - Melbourne's exhibition building.

References

Demolished buildings and structures in Sydney
Former buildings and structures in Sydney
World's fair architecture in Sydney
Landmarks in Sydney
Government buildings completed in 1879
James Barnet buildings in Sydney
1879 establishments in Australia
1882 fires in Oceania
Buildings and structures demolished in 1882
1882 in Australia
1882 disasters in Australia